The Highland Trader took over the Highland Pioneer on the Liverpool and Morecambe Bay production support charter for BHP and Centrica.

External links

Merchant ships of the United Kingdom
1996 ships